Mountain Rest is a 2018 American independent drama film written and directed by Alex O Eaton and starring Natalia Dyer and Frances Conroy.

Plot
After years without contact, Ethel, an aging actress, asks her estranged daughter and granddaughter, Frankie and Clara, home for the weekend to attend an extravagant party. At 16, Clara has never met any extended family, and her grandmother’s eccentric nature is infectious. Clara is drawn deeper into her grandmother's fantasies and disillusionments, causing the rift in Clara’s relationship with her mother to widen. Meanwhile, Frankie is left to battle her own demons and face a love she left behind. These tensions culminate as Ethel’s ulterior motive for the weekend’s festivities force everyone to reconsider the roles they play in each other’s lives, and the worth of family as a whole.

Cast
Natalia Dyer as Clara
Shawn Hatosy as Bascolm
Frances Conroy as Ethel
Kate Lyn Sheil as Frankie
Joshua Brady as Sam
Karson Kern as Jim Ferris
Alphie Hyorth as Nixon
Audrey Turner as Courtey

References

External links
 
 

American independent films
American drama films
2010s English-language films
2010s American films